The Embassy of Guatemala in London is the diplomatic mission of Guatemala in the United Kingdom. It is somewhat remote from most other embassies - most of which are predominantly located in Central or West London - being located in a primarily residential area of Notting Hill Chelsea.

The Embassy had been located in Chelsea, but moved to 105a Westbourne Grove, Notting Hill, in June 2015.

Direct contact with the Embassy can be established through their official website or through the Embassy's UK landline 020 7221 1525.

Gallery

References

Guatemala
Diplomatic missions of Guatemala
Guatemala–United Kingdom relations
Buildings and structures in the Royal Borough of Kensington and Chelsea
Notting Hill